20 Years Queer is a concert tour by American rock band Garbage, to mark the twentieth anniversary of their debut album Garbage. The title also references the band's early single "Queer", and the promotional poster is redolent of the self-titled album's pink feather artwork. The tour was preceded by a special 20-year edition of the record, which was re-mastered and featured remixes and previously unreleased versions of album tracks. Garbage performed the album in its entirety as well as all the B-sides recorded during that period.

Tour announcement

The commemorative tour was initially announced in March with shows confirmed in Paris and London, and was expected to travel to a number of cities worldwide. Further European dates, including a "homecoming" concert in Edinburgh, were announced over the following three months. The entire itinerary of North American dates were announced in June 2015.

Upon the announcement of the tour, Shirley Manson stated: "This is the album that started everything for us and we look back on it with great fondness. It’s been really great to revisit these songs whilst working on new material – interesting to see how the essence of the band remains strong as we evolve". Guitarist Steve Marker later commented: "We're just as surprised to be here now, intact, so many years later, enthusiastically preparing to get back on the road with that album...A big piece of our lives remains caught up in the making of that record, and we know it holds a special place for the fans that have kept us going for so long".

Garbage was supported on North American shows by singer/songwriter Torres. Support on all European shows, except Moscow, was provided by indie pop band Dutch Uncles.

Setlists

Around 15 minutes before showtime, a large white curtain dropped down in front of the stage. The live show was preceded by an introductory video compiled from footage of Garbage on their first tour and pop cultural moments of the era, sound-tracked by the bands largely-instrumental B-side "Alien Sex Fiend". The video was projected onto the curtain, which the band performed "Subhuman" behind, lit up in silhouette; the curtain dropped to the floor as soon as "Supervixen" began.

The initial North American shows featured the set split into blocks of six album tracks, then a batch of B-sides, followed by the remaining album tracks and then again, B-sides, in almost running order on disc. Further into the tour, the set order was rejigged to flow better live. The end of each night featured two bonus tracks from other eras of the band's career. These were picked from a rotation of: "Push It", "I Think I'm Paranoid" or "When I Grow Up" from Version 2.0; "Cherry Lips" from Beautiful Garbage; "Bad Boyfriend" or "Why Do You Love Me" from Bleed Like Me; or "Automatic Systematic Habit" from Not Your Kind of People.

Tour dates

Promotional performances

References

External links
Garbage official website

2015 concert tours
Garbage (band) concert tours